Livezi is a commune in Bacău County, Western Moldavia, Romania. It is composed of six villages: Bălăneasa, Livezi, Orășa, Poiana, Prăjoaia and Scăriga.

Natives
 Gheorghe Poenaru

References

Communes in Bacău County
Localities in Western Moldavia